Ragnvald Ingebrigtsen (30 November 1882 – 13 January 1975) was a Norwegian physician who is regarded a pioneer in the development of surgery in Norway.

He was born in Hammerfest, and was married to actress Gerd Egede-Nissen from 1922 to 1940, and to the sister of his first wife, Gøril Havrevold, from 1962. He graduated as cand.med. in 1907, and worked as a physician in Stavanger from 1908 to 1911. He then worked two years at the Rockefeller Institute in New York City, where he studied neurosurgery, and further studied bacteriology and histology in Paris. He was appointed professor in surgery at the University of Oslo from 1928. Among his works is his thesis from 1917/1918, Om nervetransplantation, and Nordisk lærebok i kirurgi (first edition 1920, in cooperation with G. Petrén). He was decorated Knight, First Class of the Order of St. Olav in 1959 and of the Danish Order of the Dannebrog.

He received too the Médaille de la Reconnaissance française, bronze, in 1920 for his action as benevolent in the chirurgical service of the hospital of Pantin

References

1882 births
1975 deaths
People from Hammerfest
Norwegian surgeons
University of Oslo alumni
Academic staff of the University of Oslo
Rockefeller University faculty
Norwegian expatriates in the United States
Norwegian expatriates in France
Chevaliers of the Légion d'honneur
Knights of the Order of the Dannebrog